Peter Christian Weber Jr. (born August 4, 1991) is an American television personality and an airline pilot. Weber placed third on season 15 of The Bachelorette, and was later cast as the star of season 24 of The Bachelor. Outside of his work on television, Weber works as a pilot for United Airlines.

Early life
Weber was born in Fairfax, Virginia, United States, and lived with his family in Florida before they moved to California. Weber's father, Peter, is a pilot, while his mother, Barbara (née Figarola), is a real-estate broker and former flight attendant. She was also Miss Illinois World in 1978. He has a younger brother, Jack, who also is a pilot. His father has German ancestry, while his mother is Cuban. Weber was raised in Westlake Village, California and graduated from Oaks Christian School in 2009, where he played on the football team and was in a national rocketry competition In his youth, Weber was a child actor who portrayed a young Roman Brady in one episode of the soap opera Days of Our Lives.

Career 
Weber attended Baylor University, though he left before graduating to pursue a career as a pilot. In 2015, Weber became a commercial pilot for Compass Airlines. He worked for Compass for three years, until becoming an airline transport pilot for Delta Air Lines in 2018.  In May 2021, he left Delta Air Lines to pilot for United Airlines.

Reality television
In 2019, Weber was cast in season 15 of The Bachelorette, starring former Miss Alabama USA Hannah Brown. Filming took place throughout the spring of 2019, and Weber was later revealed as a contestant by the American Broadcasting Company (ABC) on May 7, 2019. Weber went on to place third, being eliminated by Brown during part one of the finale episode. During the reunion episode of season six of Bachelor in Paradise, Weber was announced by host Chris Harrison as the lead for the 24th season of The Bachelor.

Personal life 
Sometime after finishing filming for The Bachelor, Weber began a relationship with Chicago-based attorney Kelley Flanagan, who had placed fifth in the season. They publicly confirmed their relationship in May 2020. On December 31, 2020, Weber announced on Instagram that he and Flanagan had ended their relationship. However, almost two years later, the pair rekindled their relationship. The couple confirmed they were back together in October 2022 by attending public events as couple.

Filmography

References

External links

1991 births
American male child actors
American people of Cuban descent
American people of German descent
Aviators from California
Bachelor Nation contestants
Hispanic and Latino American people in television
Living people
People from Westlake Village, California
Television personalities from California
Baylor University alumni
Delta Air Lines people